Hypomolis evippus is a moth of the family Erebidae. It was described by Herbert Druce in 1898. It is found in Bolivia.

References

Arctiini
Moths described in 1898